Adaraye Namayen (Feel My Love) is a 2008 Sri Lankan Sinhala romantic drama film co-directed by Indian filmmaker A. R. Sorriyan and Sri Lankan filmmaker N. Nathan and co-produced by S. Raja and A. Raja. It stars Roshan Ranawana, Kishani Alanki and Shan Gunathilake in lead roles along with Sanath Gunathilake and Rajitha Hiran. It's a remake of 2004 Telugu movie Arya starring Allu Arjun. The music was composed by Bathiya and Santhush.

Cast
 Roshan Ranawana as Roshan
 Kishani Alanki as Duleeka
 Shan Gunathilake as Ajith
 Sanath Gunathilake
 Tharaka Danthanarayana
 Nirosha Maddumage
 Rajitha Hiran

Soundtrack

References

External links
http://archives.dailynews.lk/2008/10/13/fea10.asp

2008 films
2000s Sinhala-language films
Remakes of Indian films
2008 romantic drama films
Sri Lankan romantic drama films